The Stranded may refer to:
 The Stranded (TV series), a 2019 Thai television series 
 The Stranded (comics), an American comic series created by Virgin Comics
 "The Stranded" (Seinfeld), an episode of the American TV series Seinfeld

See also
 Stranded (disambiguation)